The 2006 ATS Formel 3 Cup season was a multi-event motor racing championship for single-seat open wheel formula racing cars that held across Europe. The championship featured drivers competing in two-litre Formula Three racing cars built by Dallara, Ligier, Lola and SLC which conform to the technical regulations, or formula, for the championship.  It was the fourth edition of the ATS F3 Cup. It commenced on 22 April at Oschersleben and ended on 1 October at the same place after ten double-header rounds.

The title was won by Ho-Pin Tung, who became the first Chinese driver to win the Formula Three championship. He achieved nine wins, to overcome his teammate Ferdinand Kool by 46 points, who was victorious at Lausitz. The third place went to Harald Schlegelmilch, who clinched both the Trophy and Rookie titles and won three from four races at Assen. Seyffarth Motorsport driver Renger van der Zande lost two points to Schlegelmilch in both the main and Rookie championship to finish fourth and second respectively. Nico Hülkenberg won the race at Hockenheim and completed the top five. Schlegelmilch's teammate Joey Foster was the last driver to win more than one race. He did it at Oschersleben, Hockenheim and Nürburgring. Other wins were shared between Nathan Antunes and Johnny Cecotto Jr.

Teams and drivers

Calendar

Results

Standings

ATS Formel 3 Cup
Points are awarded as follows:

Trophy

Points are awarded as follows:

† — Drivers did not finish the race, but were classified as they completed over 90% of the race distance.

Rookie

Points are awarded as follows:

† — Drivers did not finish the race, but were classified as they completed over 90% of the race distance.

References

External links
 

German Formula Three Championship seasons
Formula Three season
German
German Formula 3 Championship